Punjabi House is a 1998 Indian Malayalam-language comedy drama film written and directed by Rafi Mecartin. It stars Dileep and Harisree Ashokan as comedy duo Unni and Ramanan with Mohini, Jomol, Lal, Cochin Haneefa, Thilakan, Janardhanan and N. F. Varghese in pivotal roles. The music was composed by Suresh Peters and S. P. Venkatesh, the former composing the songs, making his debut as a film composer and the latter composing the score. The film was released as an Onam release on 4 September 1998. The film was a blockbuster at release even though it clashed with Mammootty-Mohanlal starrer Harikrishnans. Many dialogues from the film turned into popular catchphrases. The character Ramanan played by Harishree Ashokan is considered one of the best comedy characters in Malayalam movies and has a cult status. The movie is considered one of the best slapstick comedy film in Malayalam cinema and it established Dileep as a leading star and catapulted him into stardom.

The film was remade in Telugu as Maa Balaji in 1999, in Kannada with the same title in 2002 and in Hindi as Chup Chup Ke in 2006. This film had a cult following among the audience.

Plot
Unni is an unsuccessful entrepreneur, who is in deep debt and in no situation to repay them. Due to torment from his many creditors and lack of solace from his family, he decides to commit suicide (faking it as an accident) so that his debts can be repaid with the insurance money. He jumps off the pier into the sea only to be rescued by fishermen from a distant coast, named Gangadharan and his employee Ramanan. Unni pretends to be deaf and mute in front of them, so as to not reveal the truth. Back at home, his family is denied insurance, stating unconfirmed death (owing to lack of body), putting them in a difficult situation on repaying the debt.

Gangadharan has a debt of his own, to a Punjabi family of moneylenders who are settled in Kerala. The situation demands Unni and Ramanan to work at their home until he can repay the sum. There he meets a Punjabi girl named Pooja, who is mute. She finds out that he is not deaf or mute and considers him to be a fraudster, but later sympathises with him after learning his situation. She pays off his debt through Ramanan, without revealing to his family about their living son. The couple eventually falls in love and decide to get married. Her family agrees to their marriage on the condition that he will never desert her, as she had a traumatic failed marriage proposition in the past.

From Ramanan, by a slip of the tongue, Unni's family learns of his survival. They find him and demand him to come back, as Sujatha who was in love with him, still waits for him living as his widow. He is shocked by the news but decides not to return because he does not want to put Pooja through more agony. During the marriage ceremony the next day, the family intervenes, but when Sujatha sees Pooja and the pain that she is going to inflict on her family, she finally decides to let go of him.

Cast

Soundtrack

Release
This film was released on 4 September 1998, as an Onam release along with six other major releases, becoming the 2nd highest grossing movie of year.

Legacy
The movie is hailed as one of the best Malayalam comedy movies ever made. The character of Ramanan, portrayed by Harisree Asokan has achieved cult status and a huge following over the years, being one of Asokan's most well-known roles. It is considered to be one of the most memorable characters of Malayalam Cinema.

Remakes
Punjabi House was remade in Hindi as Chup Chup Ke, directed by Priyadarshan.
Punjabi House was remade in Telugu as Maa Balaji , directed by Kodi Ramakrishna.
Punjabi House was remade in Kannada in the same name.

References

External links

1990s Malayalam-language films
1998 films
1998 comedy-drama films
Malayalam films remade in other languages
Indian comedy-drama films
Films about Sikhism
Films shot in Kochi
Films shot in Alappuzha
Films scored by Suresh Peters
Films directed by Rafi–Mecartin